Slideling is the third solo album by British singer-songwriter Ian McCulloch and was released in 2003. The album features guest appearances by Coldplay singer Chris Martin, who provides backing vocals and piano on "Sliding" as well as piano on "Arthur"; Coldplay lead guitarist Jonny Buckland, who plays guitar on "Sliding" and "Arthur"; and actor John Simm, who plays guitar on "Sliding".

Track listing
"Love in Veins" – 3:25
"Playgrounds and City Parks" – 3:17
"Sliding" – 3:37
"Baby Hold On" – 3:52
"Arthur" – 3:39
"Seasons" – 4:10
"Another Train" – 3:58
"High Wires" – 4:14
"She Sings (All My Life)" – 3:12
"Kansas" – 4:41
"Stake Your Claim" – 4:05

Personnel
Ian McCulloch – vocals, rhythm guitar, record producer
Peter Byrne – lead guitar
Peter Wilkinson – bass, backing vocals
Ceri James – piano, keyboards
Simon Finley – drums
Ian Bracken – cello
Barriemore Barlow – percussion
Malcolm Johnston – viola
Kate Evans – violin
Martin Richardson – violin
Chris Martin – backing vocals ("Sliding" and "Arthur"), piano ("Arthur")
John Simm – electric guitar ("Sliding")
Jonny Buckland – electric guitar ("Sliding" and "Arthur")
Cenzo Townshend – producer, engineer, mixing
Kevin Metcalfe – mastering
Tom Stanley – Pro Tools

References

2003 albums
Ian McCulloch (singer) albums
Cooking Vinyl albums